The Council for Research Excellence (CRE) is an independent research group created in 2005 and funded by Nielsen, with a mandate to advance the knowledge and practice of audience measurement methodology. The CRE identifies specific methodological research projects, selects research providers and reports the findings to Nielsen's client base. The organization has numerous working committees including: Big Data, Digital Research, Education, Local Measurement, Media Consumption & Engagement, Return Path Measurement, ROI, Sample Quality and Social Media.  CRE is headquartered in New York City.

The CRE is composed of senior-level industry researchers representing advertisers, broadcast networks, basic cable networks, broadcast syndication companies, local television stations and industry trade associations.
 
CRE members represent a broad cross-section of companies including ABC, AMC Networks, Assembly, CBS, Comcast, Cox Media Group, Warner Bros. Discovery, ESPN, Gannett Company, Greater Media,  Group M, Havas Media, Horizon Media, ITN Networks,  Katz Media Group, Kimberly-Clark, LIN Media, Magna Global, the Media Rating Council, MoffettNathanson LLC, the National Association of Broadcasters, NBC, Nielsen,  Omnicom Group, the Radio Advertising Bureau, Raycom Media, Starcom MediaVest Group, Nexstar Media Group, The Walt Disney Company, Twitter, Universal McCann, Univision, Paramount Media Networks and Warner Bros. Television.

Studies conducted to date by the CRE include: "Big Data Primer"
"Acceleration Ethnography Study"
"Talking Social TV"

Parts 1 and 2); "Measuring the Un-Measured Viewer;" "Response Bias Revisited;" "The Current State of Marketing Mix Models;" "Marketplace Practices Study;" "Can Publisher Data Play a Role in the Digital Advertising Ecosystem?;" "Video Consumer Mapping Study;" "TV Untethered;" "UX: The Video User Experience;" "Neurological Assessment of Cross-Screen Advertising" "The State of Set-Top Box Viewing Data;" "The Evolution of the Set-Top Box;" "Diary Market Ratings Analysis;" "Study of Media-Related Universe Estimates" and "Acceleration Ethnography Study.

References

External links
Official website

Research organizations in the United States
2005 establishments in New York (state)
Research institutes established in 2005
Organizations based in New York City